In mathematics, a real number is a number that can be used to measure a continuous one-dimensional quantity such as a distance, duration or temperature. Here, continuous means that values can have arbitrarily small variations., as opposed to Integer, Whole and Natural numbers 1, 2, 3, 4 and so on. Every real number can be almost uniquely represented by an infinite decimal expansion.

The real numbers are fundamental in calculus (and more generally in all mathematics), in particular by their role in the classical definitions of limits, continuity and derivatives.

The real numbers include the rational numbers, such as the integer  and the fraction . The rest of the real numbers are called irrational numbers, and include algebraic numbers (such as the square root ) and transcendental numbers (such as ).

Real numbers can be thought of as all points on an infinitely long line called the number line or real line, where the points corresponding to integers are equally spaced.

Conversely, analytic geometry is the association of points on lines (especially axis lines) to real numbers such that geometric displacements are proportional to differences between corresponding numbers.

The informal descriptions above of the real numbers are not sufficient for ensuring the correctness of proofs of theorems involving real numbers. The realization that a better definition was needed, and the elaboration of such a definition was a major development of 19th-century mathematics and is the foundation of real analysis, the study of real functions and real-valued sequences. A current axiomatic definition is that real numbers form the unique (up to an isomorphism) Dedekind-complete ordered field. Other common definitions of real numbers include equivalence classes of Cauchy sequences (of rational numbers), Dedekind cuts, and infinite decimal representations. All these definitions satisfy the axiomatic definition and are thus equivalent.

Properties

Basic properties 
 The real numbers include zero, the additive identity: adding  to any real number leaves that number unchanged: .
 Every real number  has an additive inverse  satisfying .
 The real numbers include a unit, the multiplicative identity: multiplying  by any real number leaves that number unchanged: .
 Every nonzero real number  has a multiplicative inverse  satisfying .
Thus the real numbers are closed under elementary arithmetic operations.
 The real numbers form a field.
 The real numbers are linearly ordered. If  and  then . (See also inequality (mathematics).)
 Any nonzero real number  is either negative or positive.
 The real numbers are an ordered field because the order  is compatible with addition and multiplication: if  then ; if  and  then .
 The real numbers make up an infinite set of numbers that cannot be injectively mapped to the infinite set of natural numbers, i.e., there are uncountably infinitely many real numbers, whereas the natural numbers are called countably infinite. This establishes that in some sense, there are more real numbers than there are elements in any countable set.
 Any nonempty bounded open interval (the set of all real numbers between two specified endpoints) can be mapped bijectively by an affine function (scaling and translation of the number line) to any other such interval. Every nonempty open interval contains uncountably infinitely many real numbers.
 The real numbers are unbounded. There is no greatest or least real number; the real numbers extend infinitely in both positive and negative directions.
 There is a hierarchy of countably infinite subsets of the real numbers, e.g., the integers, the rational numbers, the algebraic numbers and the computable numbers, each set being a proper subset of the next in the sequence. The complements of each of these sets in the reals (irrational, transcendental, and non-computable real numbers) is uncountably infinite.
 Real numbers can be used to express measurements of continuous quantities. They may be expressed by decimal representations, most of them having an infinite sequence of digits to the right of the decimal point; these are often represented like 324.823122147..., where the ellipsis indicates that infinitely many digits have been omitted.

More formally, the real numbers have the two basic properties of being an ordered field, and having the least upper bound property. The first says that real numbers comprise a field, with addition and multiplication as well as division by nonzero numbers, which can be totally ordered on a number line in a way compatible with addition and multiplication. The second says that, if a nonempty set of real numbers has an upper bound, then it has a real least upper bound. The second condition distinguishes the real numbers from the rational numbers: for example, the set of rational numbers whose square is less than 2 is a set with an upper bound (e.g. 1.5) but no (rational) least upper bound: hence the rational numbers do not satisfy the least upper bound property.

Completeness 

A main reason for using real numbers is so that many sequences have limits.  More formally, the reals are complete (in the sense of metric spaces or uniform spaces, which is a different sense than the Dedekind completeness of the order in the previous section):

A sequence (xn) of real numbers is called a Cauchy sequence if for any  there exists an integer N (possibly depending on ε) such that the distance  is less than ε for all n and m that are both greater than N. This definition, originally provided by Cauchy, formalizes the fact that the xn eventually come and remain arbitrarily close to each other.

A sequence (xn) converges to the limit x if its elements eventually come and remain arbitrarily close to x, that is, if for any  there exists an integer N (possibly depending on ε) such that the distance  is less than ε for n greater than N.

Every convergent sequence is a Cauchy sequence, and the converse is true for real numbers, and this means that the topological space of the real numbers is complete.

The set of rational numbers is not complete. For example, the sequence (1; 1.4; 1.41; 1.414; 1.4142; 1.41421; ...), where each term adds a digit of the decimal expansion of the positive square root of 2, is Cauchy but it does not converge to a rational number (in the real numbers, in contrast, it converges to the positive square root of 2).

The completeness property of the reals is the basis on which calculus, and, more generally mathematical analysis are built. In particular, the test that a sequence is a Cauchy sequence allows proving that a sequence has a limit, without computing it, and even without knowing it.

For example, the standard series of the exponential function

converges to a real number for every x, because the sums

can be made arbitrarily small (independently of M) by choosing N sufficiently large. This proves that the sequence is Cauchy, and thus converges, showing that  is well defined for every x.

"The complete ordered field" 
The real numbers are often described as "the complete ordered field", a phrase that can be interpreted in several ways.

First, an order can be lattice-complete. It is easy to see that no ordered field can be lattice-complete, because it can have no largest element (given any element z,  is larger).

Additionally, an order can be Dedekind-complete, see . The uniqueness result at the end of that section justifies using the word "the" in the phrase "complete ordered field" when this is the sense of "complete" that is meant. This sense of completeness is most closely related to the construction of the reals from Dedekind cuts, since that construction starts from an ordered field (the rationals) and then forms the Dedekind-completion of it in a standard way.

These two notions of completeness ignore the field structure. However, an ordered group (in this case, the additive group of the field) defines a uniform structure, and uniform structures have a notion of completeness; the description in § Completeness is a special case. (We refer to the notion of completeness in uniform spaces rather than the related and better known notion for metric spaces, since the definition of metric space relies on already having a characterization of the real numbers.) It is not true that  is the only uniformly complete ordered field, but it is the only uniformly complete Archimedean field, and indeed one often hears the phrase "complete Archimedean field" instead of "complete ordered field". Every uniformly complete Archimedean field must also be Dedekind-complete (and vice versa), justifying using "the" in the phrase "the complete Archimedean field". This sense of completeness is most closely related to the construction of the reals from Cauchy sequences (the construction carried out in full in this article), since it starts with an Archimedean field (the rationals) and forms the uniform completion of it in a standard way.

But the original use of the phrase "complete Archimedean field" was by David Hilbert, who meant still something else by it. Thus  is "complete" in the sense that nothing further can be added to it without making it no longer an Archimedean field. This sense of completeness is most closely related to the construction of the reals from surreal numbers, since that construction starts with a proper class that contains every ordered field (the surreals) and then selects from it the largest Archimedean subfield.

Cardinality 
The set of all real numbers is uncountable, in the sense that while both the set of all natural numbers  and the set of all real numbers are infinite sets, there can be no one-to-one function from the real numbers to the natural numbers. It is strictly greater than the cardinality of the set of all natural numbers (denoted  and called  'aleph-naught'), and equals the cardinality of the power set of the set of the natural numbers.

It is neither provable nor refutable using the axioms of Zermelo–Fraenkel set theory including the axiom of choice (ZFC)—the standard foundation of modern mathematics. In fact, some models of ZFC satisfy CH, while others violate it.

Advanced properties 

As a topological space, the real numbers are separable. This is because the set of rationals, which is countable, is dense in the real numbers. The irrational numbers are also dense in the real numbers, however they are uncountable and have the same cardinality as the reals.

The real numbers form a metric space: the distance between x and y is defined as the absolute value . By virtue of being a totally ordered set, they also carry an order topology; the topology arising from the metric and the one arising from the order are identical, but yield different presentations for the topology—in the order topology as ordered intervals, in the metric topology as epsilon-balls. The Dedekind cuts construction uses the order topology presentation, while the Cauchy sequences construction uses the metric topology presentation. The reals form a contractible (hence connected and simply connected), separable and complete metric space of Hausdorff dimension 1. The real numbers are locally compact but not compact. There are various properties that uniquely specify them; for instance, all unbounded, connected, and separable order topologies are necessarily homeomorphic to the reals.

Also, every polynomial of odd degree admits at least one real root: these two properties make  the premier example of a real closed field. Proving this is the first half of one proof of the fundamental theorem of algebra.

The reals carry a canonical measure, the Lebesgue measure, which is the Haar measure on their structure as a topological group normalized such that the unit interval [0;1] has measure 1. There exist sets of real numbers that are not Lebesgue measurable, e.g. Vitali sets.

The supremum axiom of the reals refers to subsets of the reals and is therefore a second-order logical statement. It is not possible to characterize the reals with first-order logic alone: the Löwenheim–Skolem theorem implies that there exists a countable dense subset of the real numbers satisfying exactly the same sentences in first-order logic as the real numbers themselves.

Zermelo–Fraenkel set theory with the axiom of choice guarantees the existence of a basis of this vector space: there exists a set B of real numbers such that every real number can be written uniquely as a finite linear combination of elements of this set, using rational coefficients only, and such that no element of B is a rational linear combination of the others. However, this existence theorem is purely theoretical, as such a base has never been explicitly described.

(The standard ordering ≤ of the real numbers is not a well-ordering since e.g. an open interval does not contain a least element in this ordering.) Again, the existence of such a well-ordering is purely theoretical, as it has not been explicitly described. If V=L is assumed in addition to the axioms of ZF, a well ordering of the real numbers can be shown to be explicitly definable by a formula.

A real number may be either computable or uncomputable; either algorithmically random or not; and either arithmetically random or not.

History 

Simple fractions were used by the Egyptians around 1000 BC; the Vedic "Shulba Sutras" ("The rules of chords") in  include what may be the first "use" of irrational numbers. The concept of irrationality was implicitly accepted by early Indian mathematicians such as Manava , who was aware that the square roots of certain numbers, such as 2 and 61, could not be exactly determined. Around 500 BC, the Greek mathematicians led by Pythagoras also realized that the square root of 2 is irrational.

The Middle Ages brought about the acceptance of zero, negative numbers, integers, and fractional numbers, first by Indian and Chinese mathematicians, and then by Arabic mathematicians, who were also the first to treat irrational numbers as algebraic objects (the latter being made possible by the development of algebra). Arabic mathematicians merged the concepts of "number" and "magnitude" into a more general idea of real numbers. The Egyptian mathematician Abū Kāmil Shujā ibn Aslam  was the first to accept irrational numbers as solutions to quadratic equations, or as coefficients in an equation (often in the form of square roots, cube roots and fourth roots). In Europe, such numbers, not commensurable with the numerical unit, were called irrational or surd ("deaf").

In the 16th century, Simon Stevin created the basis for modern decimal notation, and insisted that there is no difference between rational and irrational numbers in this regard.

In the 17th century, Descartes introduced the term "real" to describe roots of a polynomial, distinguishing them from "imaginary" ones.

In the 18th and 19th centuries, there was much work on irrational and transcendental numbers. Lambert (1761) gave a flawed proof that  cannot be rational; Legendre (1794) completed the proof and showed that  is not the square root of a rational number. Liouville (1840) showed that neither  nor  can be a root of an integer quadratic equation, and then established the existence of transcendental numbers; Cantor (1873) extended and greatly simplified this proof. Hermite (1873) proved that  is transcendental, and Lindemann (1882), showed that  is transcendental. Lindemann's proof was much simplified by Weierstrass (1885), Hilbert (1893), Hurwitz, and Gordan.

The developers of calculus used real numbers without having defined them rigorously. The first rigorous definition was published by Cantor in 1871. In 1874, he showed that the set of all real numbers is uncountably infinite, but the set of all algebraic numbers is countably infinite. Cantor's first uncountability proof was different from his famous diagonal argument published in 1891.

Formal definitions 

The real number system  can be defined axiomatically up to an isomorphism, which is described hereafter. There are also many ways to construct "the" real number system, and a popular approach involves starting from natural numbers, then defining rational numbers algebraically, and finally defining real numbers as equivalence classes of their Cauchy sequences or as Dedekind cuts, which are certain subsets of rational numbers. Another approach is to start from some rigorous axiomatization of Euclidean geometry (say of Hilbert or of Tarski), and then define the real number system geometrically. All these constructions of the real numbers have been shown to be equivalent, in the sense that the resulting number systems are isomorphic.

Axiomatic approach 
Let  denote the set of all real numbers, then:

 The set  is a field, meaning that addition and multiplication are defined and have the usual properties.
 The field  is ordered, meaning that there is a total order ≥ such that for all real numbers x, y and z:
 if x ≥ y, then x + z ≥ y + z;
 if x ≥ 0 and y ≥ 0, then xy ≥ 0.

The last property is what differentiates the real numbers from the rational numbers (and from other more exotic ordered fields). For example,  has a rational upper bound (e.g., 1.42), but no least rational upper bound, because  is not rational.

These properties imply the Archimedean property (which is not implied by other definitions of completeness), which states that the set of integers has no upper bound in the reals. In fact, if this were false, then the integers would have a least upper bound N; then, N – 1 would not be an upper bound, and there would be an integer n such that , and thus , which is a contradiction with the upper-bound property of N.

The real numbers are uniquely specified by the above properties. This uniqueness allows us to think of them as essentially the same mathematical object.

Construction from the rational numbers 
The real numbers can be constructed as a completion of the rational numbers, in such a way that a sequence defined by a decimal or binary expansion like (3; 3.1; 3.14; 3.141; 3.1415; ...) converges to a unique real number—in this case . For details and other constructions of real numbers, see construction of the real numbers.

Applications and connections

Physics 
In the physical sciences, most physical constants such as the universal gravitational constant, and physical variables, such as position, mass, speed, and electric charge, are modeled using real numbers. In fact, the fundamental physical theories such as classical mechanics, electromagnetism, quantum mechanics, general relativity and the standard model are described using mathematical structures, typically smooth manifolds or Hilbert spaces, that are based on the real numbers, although actual measurements of physical quantities are of finite accuracy and precision.

Physicists have occasionally suggested that a more fundamental theory would replace the real numbers with quantities that do not form a continuum, but such proposals remain speculative.

Logic 
The real numbers are most often formalized using the Zermelo–Fraenkel axiomatization of set theory, but some mathematicians study the real numbers with other logical foundations of mathematics. In particular, the real numbers are also studied in reverse mathematics and in constructive mathematics.

The hyperreal numbers as developed by Edwin Hewitt, Abraham Robinson and others extend the set of the real numbers by introducing infinitesimal and infinite numbers, allowing for building infinitesimal calculus in a way closer to the original intuitions of Leibniz, Euler, Cauchy and others.

Edward Nelson's internal set theory enriches the Zermelo–Fraenkel set theory syntactically by introducing a unary predicate "standard". In this approach, infinitesimals are (non-"standard") elements of the set of the real numbers (rather than being elements of an extension thereof, as in Robinson's theory).

Paul Cohen proved in 1963 that it is an axiom independent of the other axioms of set theory; that is: one may choose either the continuum hypothesis or its negation as an axiom of set theory, without contradiction.

Computation 
Electronic calculators and computers cannot operate on arbitrary real numbers, because finite computers cannot directly store infinitely many digits or other infinite representations. Nor do they usually even operate on arbitrary definable real numbers, which are inconvenient to manipulate.

Instead, computers typically work with finite-precision approximations called floating-point numbers, a representation similar to scientific notation. The achievable precision is limited by the data storage space allocated for each number, whether as fixed-point, floating-point, or arbitrary-precision numbers, or some other representation.  Most scientific computation uses binary floating-point arithmetic, often a 64-bit representation with around 16 decimal digits of precision. Real numbers satisfy the usual rules of arithmetic, but floating-point numbers do not. The field of numerical analysis studies the stability and accuracy of numerical algorithms implemented with approximate arithmetic.

But exact and symbolic arithmetic also have limitations: for instance, they are computationally more expensive; it is not in general possible to determine whether two symbolic expressions are equal (the constant problem); and arithmetic operations can cause exponential explosion in the size of representation of a single number (for instance, squaring a rational number roughly doubles the number of digits in its numerator and denominator, and squaring a polynomial roughly doubles its number of terms), overwhelming finite computer storage.

A real number is called computable if there exists an algorithm that yields its digits. Because there are only countably many algorithms, but an uncountable number of reals, almost all real numbers fail to be computable. Moreover, the equality of two computable numbers is an undecidable problem. Some constructivists accept the existence of only those reals that are computable. The set of definable numbers is broader, but still only countable.

Set theory 
In set theory, specifically descriptive set theory, the Baire space is used as a surrogate for the real numbers since the latter have some topological properties (connectedness) that are a technical inconvenience. Elements of Baire space are referred to as "reals".

Vocabulary and notation 
The set of all real numbers is denoted  (blackboard bold) or R (upright bold). As it is naturally endowed with the structure of a field, the expression field of real numbers is frequently used when its algebraic properties are under consideration.

The non-negative real numbers can be noted  but one often sees this set noted  In French mathematics, the positive real numbers and negative real numbers commonly include zero, and these sets are noted respectively  and  In this understanding, the respective sets without zero are called strictly positive real numbers and strictly negative real numbers, and are noted  and 

In this identification, a point of the Euclidean space is identified with the tuple of its Cartesian coordinates.

In mathematics, real is used as an adjective, meaning that the underlying field is the field of the real numbers (or the real field). For example, real matrix, real polynomial and real Lie algebra. The word is also used as a noun, meaning a real number (as in "the set of all reals").

Generalizations and extensions 
The real numbers can be generalized and extended in several different directions:

 The complex numbers contain solutions to all polynomial equations and hence are an algebraically closed field unlike the real numbers. However, the complex numbers are not an ordered field.
It is a compact space. It is no longer a field, or even an additive group, but it still has a total order; moreover, it is a complete lattice.
 The real projective line adds only one value . It is also a compact space. Again, it is no longer a field, or even an additive group. However, it allows division of a nonzero element by zero. It has cyclic order described by a separation relation.
The long real line is the largest ordered set that is complete and locally Archimedean. As with the previous two examples, this set is no longer a field or additive group.
 Ordered fields extending the reals are the hyperreal numbers and the surreal numbers; both of them contain infinitesimal and infinitely large numbers and are therefore non-Archimedean ordered fields.
 Self-adjoint operators on a Hilbert space (for example, self-adjoint square complex matrices) generalize the reals in many respects: they can be ordered (though not totally ordered), they are complete, all their eigenvalues are real and they form a real associative algebra. Positive-definite operators correspond to the positive reals and normal operators correspond to the complex numbers.

See also 

 Completeness of the real numbers
 Continued fraction
 Definable real numbers
 Positive real numbers
 Real analysis

Notes

References

Citations

Sources 
 
 
 
 
 
 
 
  Vol. 2, 1989. Vol. 3, 1990.
 
  Translated from the German Grundlagen der Analysis, 1930.

External links 
 

 
Real algebraic geometry
Elementary mathematics